Nantporth is a football stadium in Bangor, Wales. Bangor City F.C. played between January 2012 and 2022, having moved from their previous ground, Farrar Road, that opened in the 1920s.

History
Previously the ground was used occasionally by Bangor University football and rugby clubs, as well as practical lectures by the university's 'Normal Site' campus, which is home to the Sports Science and Education faculties. The main pitch overlooks the Menai Strait, with views in both directions along the coast.

Building work started on the new stadium in August 2011, and was completed in January 2012.

The stadium was built by developer Watkin Jones as part of a joint project with Morbaine Ltd. Both companies formed a further company "Deiniol Developments" for the purpose of the Nantporth construction and the development of the football club's former home at Farrar Road into an Asda supermarket. The work was undertaken on behalf of Bangor City Council, the site owners. Under this agreement the developers installed 805 seats in the main stand. The club have installed a further approximate 300 seats in the Menai Stand on the opposite side of the pitch. A planning application has been submitted for further seating to be installed. Bangor City hoped to take the overall seating to over 1,500 in time for Bangor to play any European matches there at the end of the 2012–13 season should they qualify. In 2015 the installation of a full-size astro-turf training pitch on the same site was completed.

In January 2019, the water and electric supply to the stadium was cut off due to an outstanding debt of £25,000 and the club had to play at Maesdu Park in Llandudno instead.

It was announced in August 2022 that the club had surrendered its lease on the stadium.

Attendances
The five largest attendances for Bangor City in League, Cup or European matches at Nantporth have been:

There was also a crowd of over 1,200 for the first game, a North Wales Coast Challenge Cup match for Bangor against Caernarfon Wanderers on 24 January 2012 and a crowd of over 1,000 for the North Wales Coast Challenge Cup Final against Caernarfon Town on 13 May 2014. There are however, no official figures published for these matches and they are considered minor cup matches.  A friendly match against Liverpool F.C. under-23 on 4 January 2017 brought in an attendance of 2,006. On 26 January 2019, Bangor hosted Caernarfon Town in the Welsh Cup fourth round and lost 2–1. This attracted 2,486 spectators, the largest in any Welsh Cup game for over 20 years.

The stadium also hosts men's and women's football biennially as part of the Varsity Series tournament between Bangor University and Aberystwyth University.

Sponsors

References

Bangor, Gwynedd
Football venues in Wales
Welsh Cup final venues
Stadiums in Wales
Multi-purpose stadiums in the United Kingdom
Sports venues completed in 2012
Bangor City F.C.